Bakytbek Mamatov is a Kyrgyzstani footballer who plays for Alay Osh after leaving FC Abdysh-Ata Kant in 2014. He is a member of the Kyrgyzstan national football team.

International Career Stats

Goals for Senior National Team

External links

Living people
Kyrgyzstani footballers
Kyrgyzstan international footballers
1980 births
Association football midfielders